The Advanced International Certificate of Education (AICE) is an internationally used English language curriculum offered to students in the higher levels of secondary school intended to prepare them for an honours programme during tertiary education.  The curriculum is overseen by Cambridge International Examinations which is a branch of Cambridge Assessment and operates globally.  It includes classes in the subject areas of mathematics and science; languages; and arts and humanities with two levels of difficulty Advanced Subsidiary level and Advanced level with Advanced level being more challenging.  It is mandatory for a student to have taken and passed a subject on the Advanced Level. Students need to select subject from 4 different groups (Group 1: Mathematics and Sciences, Group 2: Languages, Group 3: Arts and Humanities, Group 4: Interdisciplinary and skills-based subjects (optional)).

Successful completion of the program within a thirteen-month period confers a Cambridge AICE Diploma.  Three levels of diploma—Pass Level, with Merit and with Distinction—are offered based on the number of points that a student receives; these points depend upon factors such as the grade earned in an AICE class and the level of the class taken.  To successfully complete the curriculum, a student must achieve at least 120 points with a minimum of seven credits in courses spread across the subject areas.  

Examples of AICE classes include:
AICE Biology
AICE Business 
AICE Ceramics
AICE Chemistry
AICE Chinese Language
AICE Classical Studies
AICE Computer Science 
AICE Computing
AICE Digital Photography
AICE Drawing
AICE Economics
AICE English General Paper
AICE English Language
AICE English Literature
AICE Environmental Management
AICE European History
AICE French Language
AICE French Literature
AICE Food Studies
AICE Geography
AICE Global Perspectives
AICE Graphic Design
AICE Informational Technology
AICE International History
AICE Latin Language
AICE Latin Literature
AICE Marine Science
AICE Math
AICE Media Studies
AICE Nepali Studies
AICE Painting/Drawing
AICE Physical Science
AICE Physical Education
AICE Physics
AICE Psychology
AICE Sociology
AICE Spanish Language
AICE Spanish Literature
AICE Thinking Skills
AICE Travel & Tourism
AICE U.S. History
AICE Urdu

External links
Cambridge AICE Diploma, Cambridge International Examinations
AICE Diploma, an Introduction, Cambridge International Examinations

Cambridge International Examinations
School qualifications